Urbanus Edmund Baughman (21 May 1905 – 6 November 1978) was the chief of the United States Secret Service between 1948 and 1961, under Presidents Truman, Eisenhower, and Kennedy.

Baughman was the first Secret Service Chief to pen a memoir concerning the office he held. Entitled Secret Service Chief, it was a veritable tell-all on the intricacies and inner workings of the Secret Service and its evolution from a counterfeit detection department to the presidential protection unit.

Baughman was appointed to head the Secret Service by President Harry S. Truman shortly after the 1948 election. According to the book American Gunfight, by Stephen Hunter and John Bainbridge Jr., Truman dismissed Baughman's predecessor James J. Maloney in part because he had dispatched most of Truman's Secret Service detail to New York to prepare to guard New York Governor Thomas E. Dewey. Dewey was widely expected to be elected president but was beaten by Truman in one of the greatest upsets in presidential election history.

Personal statements

Life of the president

Baughman gave a description of the job of the president to the Senate Appropriations Committee:

[The President] cannot have what is considered a normal life, home or family relationship. He has no choice as to where he lives. He is a focal point for public and world attention. He is a slave to his office, being obliged to serve his country without cease at all hours and every day of the year. He can have very little privacy. If he has young children, they are largely governed by protocol and cannot enjoy the freedom of the White House as they would a normal home.

Threats to the president
Baughman was interviewed by Time magazine and in an article dated April 20, 1953 he described the Secret Service's biggest fear as, "escaped mental patients who bear grudges against the President or the Government." Baughman admitted that in 1952 the United States Secret Service handled 2,535 presidential protection cases.  Of these cases, 74 resulted in arrests, and 72 of those were sent to prison or mental institutions.

Organized crime
In an interview with The Washington Post published on July 26, 1961, the day after his retirement was announced, Baughman emphatically stated that there had been no mafia in the United States for 40 years.  He further denied the existence of a national crime syndicate based on talks with other law enforcement officials.

Kennedy assassination
Baughman was immediately critical of the methods used by the Secret Service following the assassination of President Kennedy.  He wanted to know why, after the first shot was fired, the Secret Service did not immediately pepper the window with machine gun fire to prevent any further shots from being fired.  He was also curious as to why, with an entire Secret Service detail and the Dallas Police Force on hand, the only shots that were fired were from the assassin.  He claimed it was basic training for all Secret Service agents that unauthorized people should be kept out of buildings.

Media appearances

A private person for much of his life, Baughman appeared on the show What's My Line? on November 27, 1955, the week before he was to be honored by the White House and would appear in Look magazine.  He also appeared on To Tell The Truth on April 9, 1957.

Death
A resident of Pine Beach, New Jersey since 1965, Baughman died on November 6, 1978, from arteriosclerotic heart disease at the Community Memorial Hospital in Toms River, New Jersey. He is buried in Arlington Cemetery in Drexel Hill, Pennsylvania along with his parents and wife Ruth, who died in 2004.

References

External links
 Papers of Urbanus E. Baughman, Dwight D. Eisenhower Presidential Library
 United States Government
 

1905 births
1978 deaths
Burials at Arlington Cemetery (Pennsylvania)
United States Secret Service agents
People from Camden, New Jersey
People from Pine Beach, New Jersey
Directors of the United States Secret Service